The 2012 gubernatorial election in the Mexican state of Morelos was held on Sunday, July 1, 2012. Incumbent Morelos Governor Marco Antonio Adame of the National Action Party (PAN) is retiring due to mandatory term limits, which limit all Mexican state governors to one, six-year term in office. The Morelos gubernatorial election coincided with the 2012 Mexican presidential and general elections.

Candidates

References

2012 elections in Mexico
Morelos
Gubernatorial
Politics of Morelos
July 2012 events in Mexico